Serafino Amedeo De Ferrari (6 May 1824 – 27 March 1885) was an Italian composer, conductor, organist, and pianist. He is best known for his operas, of which his most popular were Pipelè (1855) and Il Menestrello (1859).

Born in Genoa, Ferrari studied in his native city and in Milan. He performed widely as a concert organist and pianist. In 1852 he was highly active as a conductor in Amsterdam, after which he worked as the director of singing at the Teatro Carlo Felice in Genoa. He then worked in a similar capacity at the Teatro Carignano in Turin. He died in Genoa.

Sources
The Diaries of Giacomo Meyerbeer: The years of celebrity, 1850-1856 By Giacomo Meyerbeer, Robert Ignatius Letellier, Robert Ignatius Le Tellier

External links
 

1824 births
1885 deaths
Italian classical composers
Italian male classical composers
Italian conductors (music)
Italian male conductors (music)
Italian organists
Male organists
Italian opera composers
Male opera composers
Musicians from Genoa
19th-century pianists
19th-century classical composers
19th-century conductors (music)
19th-century Italian composers
Italian male pianists
19th-century organists